Dominique Teinkor (born May 15, 1984) is a retired Chadian football goalkeeper.

International career

He was goalkeeper of Chad national football team. He was a part of qualifying campaign for 2002 World Cup, as well as 2012 Africa Cup of Nations. He collected 7 caps for national team.

Club career

He finished his career in AS DGSSIE.

References

External links

1984 births
Living people
Chadian footballers
Place of birth missing (living people)

Association football goalkeepers
Chad international footballers